Myx Music Awards 2019 was the 14th installment of the Myx Music Awards, acknowledging the biggest hit makers of 2018 in the Philippine music industry. For the eight consecutive year, fans could vote online through the Myx website.

Nominees were announced on March 13, 2019 starting at 2:00 pm via Facebook and YouTube Live streaming. Leading the nominees was Shanti Dope with eight nominations.

For the second consecutive year, Twitter Philippines launched the MYX Music Awards 2019 exclusive emoji for using hashtags #MYXMusicAwards2019 and #MMAs2019. The popular streaming service, Spotify also made an exclusive playlist of songs nominated on the awards as well as the winners playlist.

The awards night was held on May 15, 2019 at the ABS-CBN Vertis Tent in Quezon City. It was broadcast live on MYX channel on cable and ABS-CBN TV Plus and live streamed on YouTube.

Winners and nominees
Winners are listed first and highlighted in boldface.

Multiple awards

Artists with multiple wins
The following artists received two or more awards:

Artists with multiple nominations
The following artists received more than two nominations:

References

External links
 MYX Official Site

Myx Music Awards
2019 music awards
Philippine music awards